Pennsylvania State Senate District 31 includes parts of Cumberland County and York County. It is currently represented by Republican Mike Regan.

District profile
The district includes the following areas:

Cumberland County

 Lemoyne
 Lower Allen Township
 Mechanicsburg
 New Cumberland
 Shiremanstown
 Upper Allen Township

York County

 Carroll Township
 Conewago Township
 Dillsburg
 Dover
 Dover Township
 East Manchester Township
 Fairview Township
 Franklin Township
 Franklintown
 Goldsboro
 Lewisberry
 Manchester
 Manchester Township
 Monaghan Township
 Mount Wolf
 Newberry Township
 Warrington Township
 Washington Township
 Wellsville
 West Manchester Township
 West York
 York
 York Haven

Senators

References

Pennsylvania Senate districts
Government of Cumberland County, Pennsylvania
Government of York County, Pennsylvania